Chitrapur railway station is a halt station on Konkan Railway. The preceding station on the line is Murdeshwar railway station and the next station is Bhatkal railway station.

In superhit Hindi movie Neel Kamal this railway station appears.

References 

Railway stations along Konkan Railway line
Railway stations in Uttara Kannada district
Karwar railway division